Louise Abel (September 7, 1894–1981) was a German-American sculptor and ceramist.

Abel was born in Widdern, Württemberg, Germany, and in 1909 immigrated to the United States with her parents.
She studied at the Kunstgewerbeschule in Stuttgart, as well as the Cincinnati Art Academy, the Art Students League in New York, The Louis Comfort Tiffany Foundation, the Barnes Foundation, the Pratt Institute, the Institute of Design at the Illinois Institute of Technology in Chicago, and the University of Cincinnati College of Liberal Arts. From 1919 to 1932 she worked as a decorator and sculptor at the Rookwood Pottery Company, where she sculpted many of the company's animal and figural works. In 1959 she returned to Germany.

References 

 German Immigrant Artists in America: A Biographical Dictionary, Peter C. Merrill, Scarecrow Press, 1997, page 1. .
 The Book of Rookwood Pottery, Herbert Peck, Crown Publishing Group, 1988, page 142.
 American arts & crafts from the collection of Alexandra & Sidney Sheldon, Katherine Plake Hough, Palm Springs Desert Museum, 1993, page 55.
 Women artists in the United States: a selective bibliography and resource guide on the fine and decorative arts, 1750–1986, Paula L. Chiarmonte, G.K. Hall, 1990, page 474. .

External links 
 
 The Kings Fortune article
 AskArt entry
 Archive of Letters & Sketchbook by Cincinnati Artist Louise Abel (auction)

1894 births
1981 deaths
American women ceramists
American ceramists
American women sculptors
People from Heilbronn (district)
Art Academy of Cincinnati alumni
Art Students League of New York alumni
Pratt Institute alumni
Illinois Institute of Technology alumni
University of Cincinnati alumni
20th-century American sculptors
20th-century American women artists
German emigrants to the United States
Rookwood Pottery Company